Michael Shipley (6 October 1956 – 25 July 2013) was an Australian mixing engineer, audio engineer, and record producer. Shipley's music career spanned more than 30 years – mostly working in Los Angeles. At the Grammy Awards of 2012 he won the Best Engineered Album, Non-Classical category for his joint work on  Paper Airplane (April 2011), by Alison Krauss and Union Station. Shipley died in July 2013, aged 56, of an apparent suicide.

Biography 

Michael Shipley was born on 6 October 1956, in Sydney, Australia; as a teenager he moved with his family to London. He became interested in a recording career while at school in the United Kingdom in the early 1970s. He later recalled, "One of my teachers at grammar school there was a musician who asked me to come down and sing on a record he was making. I walked into this thing called the recording studio, and it just blew my mind. It was, 'This is home,' and I knew instantly and from that point on that all I wanted to do was to work there." Shipley returned to Australia and completed secondary education at Camberwell Grammar School (class of '74) in Melbourne. He then returned to London, where he started as an assistant at Wessex Sound Studios and worked with Sex Pistols and Queen.

His first engineering sessions were during the punk rock explosion of the late 1970s and early 1980s and included recordings with the Damned. He worked alongside Robert John "Mutt" Lange for decades. His contemporaries at Wessex include producers Roy Thomas Baker and Chris Thomas, and engineers Tim Friese-Greene and Bill Price. Shipley also worked with Def Leppard on their albums, High 'n' Dry (July 1981), Pyromania (January 1983), Hysteria (August 1987) and Adrenalize (March 1992).

Asked to work with the Cars, Shipley relocated to Los Angeles in 1984. Shipley later relocated to Hawaii for a sabbatical, but returned to Los Angeles to work for Def Leppard, Shania Twain, The Corrs, Anberlin, Aerosmith, Maroon 5, Faith Hill, India.Arie, Kelly Clarkson, Green Day, Nickelback and Alison Krauss.

Death

Shipley died on 25 July 2013. Cause of death, as stated on 9 August 2013 at the memorial service, was an apparent suicide.

Discography 
Recorded work credited to Mike Shipley:

1970s

1980s

1990s

2000s

2010s

References

External links

 
 
 
 An Evening with Mike Shipley
 LA Grapevine November 2006

1956 births
2013 deaths
21st-century Australian musicians
Australian record producers
Australian guitarists
Australian audio engineers
Musicians from Sydney
Grammy Award winners
Suicides in California
21st-century guitarists
2013 suicides